Thomas Crossroads is an unincorporated community in Coweta County, Georgia, United States. It is centered at the intersection of Georgia State Route 154 and Georgia State Route 34. It uses the addresses of nearby Sharpsburg and Newnan.

External links

Unincorporated communities in Coweta County, Georgia
Unincorporated communities in Georgia (U.S. state)